Ma La Sun is a brand of millet wine, originally used in Taiwanese Film director Wei Te-sheng's movie 《Cape No. 7》. The phrase "Ma La Sun" originally means "drunk" in Ami language. This product was invented and sold by Farmers' Association in Xinyi, Nantou, with an Advertising slogan "A Thousand Years Tradition. A Brand New Taste."

Origin 
In 2006, for the need of filming 《Cape No. 7》, Wei Te-sheng asked Shinyi Hsiang Farmers' Association from Nantou County to create a brand of wine "A little tacky, a little cute, and feel local." So they invented the millet wine Ma La Sun after a month, and made it a real product after the movie. Thanks to the movie's blockbuster hit, Ma La Sun quickly become a famous brand in Taiwan.

References
 webpage of Ma La Sun in Farmers' Association

External links
"Ma La Sun" millet wine made famous in Xiamen by "Cape No. 7"
Mainland's first 'Ma La Sun' franchise store opens in Xiamen
"Ma La Sun" millet wine enter Japan (Chinese)

Taiwanese wine
Wine brands
Taiwanese brands
Taiwanese alcoholic drinks